The name of Croatia derives from Medieval Latin Croātia, itself a derivation of the native ethnonym of Croats, earlier *Xъrvate and modern-day .

Earliest record

In 2005, it was archaeologically confirmed that the ethnonym Croatorum (half-preserved) is mentioned for the first time in a church inscription found in Bijaći near Trogir dated to the end of the 8th or early 9th century.

The oldest known preserved stone inscription with full ethnonym "Cruatorum" is the 9th-century Branimir inscription found in Šopot near Benkovac, in reference to Duke Branimir, dated between 879 and 892, during his rule. The inscription mentions:

The Latin charter of Duke Trpimir, dated to 852, has been generally considered the first attestation of the ethnonym "Chroatorum". However, the original of this document has been lost, and copy has been preserved in a 1568 transcript. Lujo Margetić proposed in 2002 that the document is in fact of legislative character, dating to 840. Ivan Mužić noted in 2007 that analyses of the copy indicate it is not certain if the original was indeed older than the Branimir inscription.

In the Trpimir charter, it is mentioned:

Dux Chroatorum iuvatus munere divino […] Regnum Chroatorum

The monument with the earliest writing in Croatian containing the ethnonym xъrvatъ is the Baška tablet from 1100, which reads: zvъnъmirъ kralъ xrъvatъskъ ("Zvonimir, king of Croats").

Etymology

The exact origin and meaning of the ethnonym Hr̀vāt (Proto-Slavic *Xъrvátъ, or *Xurwātu) is still subject to scientific disagreement. The first etymological thesis about the name of the Croats stems from Constantine Porphyrogennetos (tenth century), who connected the different names of the Croats, Βελοχρωβάτοι and Χρωβάτοι (Belokhrobatoi and Khrobatoi), with the Greek word χώρα (khṓra, "land"): "Croats in Slavic language means those who have many lands". In the 13th century, Thomas the Archdeacon considered that it was connected with the name of inhabitants of the Krk isle, which he gave as Curetes, Curibantes. In the 17th century, Juraj Ratkaj found a reflexion of the verb hrvati (se) "to wrestle" in the name. A more contemporary theory believes that it might not be of native Slavic lexical stock, but a borrowing from an Iranian language. Common theories from the 20th and 21st centuries derive it from an Iranian origin, the root word being a third-century Scytho-Sarmatian form attested in the Tanais Tablets as Χοροάθος (Khoroáthos, alternate forms comprise Khoróatos and Khoroúathos).

In the 19th century, many different derivations were proposed for the Croatian ethnonym:
 Josef Dobrovský believed it to be linked to the root *hrev "tree", whereas Johann Kaspar Zeuss linked it to *haru "sword";
 Sylwiusz Mikucki connected it with Old-Indian šarv- "strike";
 Pavel Jozef Šafárik derived it from xrъbъtъ, xribъtъ, xribъ "ridge, highlanders", whereas Franz Miklosich said it derived from hrъv (hrŭv) "dance";
 Đuro Daničić considered its root to be *sar- "guard, protect";
 Fyodor Braun saw the German Harfada (Harvaða fjöllum from Hervarar saga ok Heiðreks), which would be the German name of the Carpathian Mountains, as the origin of an intermediate form Harvata;
 Rudolf Much connected it to a Proto-Germanic word hruvat- "horned", or – as Z. Gołąb later proposed  common noun *xъrvъ//*xorvъ "armor" as a prehistorical loanword from Germanic *hurwa-//*harwa- "horn-armor"; derivatives *xъrvati sę//*xъrviti sę "get armored, defend oneself" – "warriors clad with horn-armor", as a self-designation or exonym;
 Henry Hoyle Howorth, J. B. Bury, Henri Grégoire, considered that it derives from the personal name of Kubrat, the leader of the Bulgars and founder of Old Great Bulgaria.

The 20th century gave rise to many new theories regarding the origin of the name of the Croats:
 A. I. Sobolevski derived it from the Iranian words hu- "good", ravah- "space, freedom" and suffix -at-;
 Grigoriĭ Andreevich Ilʹinskiĭ derived it from *kher- "cut", as seen in the Greek word kárkharos "sharp", kharah "tough, sharp", and xorbrъ "brave";
 Hermann Hirt saw a connection with the name of a Germanic tribe Harudes (Χαροῦδες);
 Leopold Geitler, Josef Perwolf, Aleksander Brückner, Tadeusz Lehr-Spławiński and Heinz Schuster-Šewc linked the root hrv- to Slovak charviti sa "to oppose, defend" or via skъrv-/xъrv- to the Lithuanian šárvas "armor" and šarvúotas "armed, cuirassier", with suffix -at emphasizing the characteristic, giving the meaning of a "well armed man, soldier";
 Karel Oštir considered valid a connection with an unspecified Thraco-Illyrian word xъrvata- "hill";
 Max Vasmer first considered it as a loanword from Old-Iranian, *(fšu-)haurvatā- "shepherd, cattle guardian" (formed of Avestan pasu- "cattle" and verb haurvaiti "guard"), later also from Old-Iranian hu-urvatha- "friend" (also accepted by N. Zupanič).
 Niko Zupanič additionally proposed Lezgian origin from Xhurava (community) and plural suffix -th, meaning "municipalities, communities". 
 M. Budimir saw in the name a reflexion of Indo-European *skwos "gray, grayish", which in Lithuanian gives širvas;
 S. K. Sakač linked it with the Avestan name Harahvaitī, which once signified the southwestern part of modern Afghanistan, the province Arachosia. In Indo-Iranian it actually means "one that pours into ponds", which derives from the name of the Sarasvati River of Rigveda. However, although the somewhat suggestive similarity, the connection to the name of Arachosia is etymologically incorrect;
 G. Vernadsky considered a connection to the Chorasmí from Khwarezm, while F. Dvornik a link to the Krevatades or Krevatas located in the Caucasus mentioned in the De Ceremoniis (tenth century). 
 V. Miller saw in the Croatian name the Iranian hvar- "sun" and va- "bed", P. Tedesco had a similar interpretation from Iranian huravant "sunny", while others from the Slavic god Khors;
 Otto Kronsteiner suggested it might be derived from Tatar-Bashkir *chr "free" and *vata "to fight, to wage war";
 Stanisław Rospond derived it from Proto-Slavic *chorb- + suffix -rъ in the meaning of "brave";
 Oleg Trubachyov derived it from *xar-va(n)t (feminine, rich in women, ruled by women), which derived from the etymology of Sarmatians name, the Indo-Aryan *sar-ma(n)t "feminine", in both Indo-Iranian adjective suffix -ma(n)t/wa(n)t, and Indo-Aryan and the Indo-Iranian *sar- "woman", which in Iranian gives *har-.

Among them were most taken into account (1) the Germanic derivation from the Carpathian Mountains which is by now considered as obsolete; (2) the Slavic and Germanic derivations about "well armed man"/"warriors clad with horn-armor" indicating that they stood out from the other Slavs in terms of weapons and armour, but it is not convincing because no other Slavic tribe is named after the objects of material culture. Etymologically the first was a Lithuanian borrowing from much younger Middle High German sarwes, while the second with hypothetical *hurwa-//*harwa- argues a borrowing from Proto-Germanic dialect of the Bastarnae in the sub-Carpathian or Eastern Carpathian region which isn't preserved in any Slavic or Germanic language; (3) and the prevailing Iranian derivations, Vasmer's *(fšu-)haurvatā- ("cattle guardian") and Trubachyov's *xar-va(n)t (feminine, rich in women, ruled by women).
 
While linguists and historians agreed or with Vasmer's or Trubachyov's derivation, according to Tadeusz Lehr-Spławiński and Radoslav Katičić the Iranian theses doesn't entirely fit with the Croatian ethnonym, as according to them, the original plural form was Hrъvate not Hъrvate, and the vowel "a" in the Iranian harvat- is short, while in the Slavic Hrъvate it is long among others. Katičić concluded that of all the etymological considerations the Iranian is the least unlikely. Ranko Matasović also considered it of Iranian origin, but besides confirming original forms as *Xъrvátъ (sl.) and *Xъrvate (pl.), dismissed Trubachyov's derivation because was semantically and historically completely unfounded, and concluded that the only derivation which met the criteria of adaptation of Iranian language forms to Proto-Slavic, as well as historical and semantical plausibility, it is the Vasmer's assumption but with some changes, as the Proto-Slavic *Xъrvat- < *Xurwāt- comes from Proto-Ossetian / Alanian *xurvæt- or *xurvāt-, in the meaning of "one who guards" ("guardian, protector"), which was borrowed before the 7th century, and possibly was preserved as a noun in Old Polish charwat (guard).

The Medieval Latin C(h)roatae and Greek form Khrōbátoi are adaptations of Western South Slavic plural pronunciation *Xərwate from late 8th and early 9th century, and came to Greek via Frankish source. To the Proto-Slavic singular form are closest Old Russian xorvaty (*xъrvaty) and German-Lusatian Curuuadi from 11th and 12th century sources, while the old plural form *Xъrvate is correctly reflected in Old Russian Xrovate, Xrvate,  Church Slavonic xarьvate and Old Croatian Hrvate. The form Charvát in Old Czech came from Croatian-Chakavian or Old Polish (Charwaty). The Croatian ethnonym Hr̀vāt (sl.) and Hrváti (pl.) in the Kajkavian dialect also appear in the form Horvat and Horvati, while in the Chakavian dialect in the form Harvat and Harvati.

Distribution
Croatian place names can be found in northern Slavic regions such as Moravia (Czech Republic) and Slovakia, Poland, along the river Saale in Germany, in Austria and Slovenia, and in the south in Greece, Albania among others.

In Germany along Saale river there were Chruuati near Halle in 901 AD, Chruuati in 981 AD, Chruazis in 1012 AD, Churbate in 1055 AD, Grawat in 1086 AD, Curewate (now Korbetha), Großkorbetha (Curuvadi and Curuuuati 881-899 AD) and Kleinkorbetha, and Korbetha west of Leipzig; In Moravia are Charwath, or Charvaty near Olomouc, in Slovakia are Chorvaty and Chrovátice near Varadka. The Charwatynia near Kashubians in district Wejherowo, and Сhаrwаtу or Klwaty near Radom in Poland among others.

Thus in the Duchy of Carinthia one can find pagus Crouuati (954), Crauuati (961), Chrouuat (979) and Croudi (993) along upper Mura; in Middle Ages the following place names have been recorded: Krobathen, Krottendorf, Krautkogel; Kraut (before Chrowat and Croat) near Spittal. In the Duchy of Styria there are toponyms such as Chraberstorf and Krawerspach near Murau, Chrawat near Laas in Judendorf, Chrowat, Kchrawathof and Krawabten near Leoben. Along middle Mura Krawerseck, Krowot near Weiz, Krobothen near Stainz and Krobathen near Straganz. In Slovenia there are also Hrovate, Hrovača, and Hrvatini.

In the Southeastern Balkans, oeconyms Rvatska Stubica, Rvaši, Rvat(i) in Montenegro; several villages Hrvati and Gornji/Donji Hrvati in Bosnia and Herzegovina including Horvaćani (Hrvaćani Hristjanski) and Hrvatovići; Rvatsko Selo, Hrvatska, and hamlet Hrvatske Mohve in Serbia; North Macedonia has a place named Arvati (Арвати) situated near lower Prespa; in Greece there is a Charváti or Kharbáti in Attica and Harvation or Kharbátion in Argolis, as well as Charváta on Crete; and Hirvati in Albania, among others in other countries.

Anthroponyms

The ethnonym also inspired many anthroponyms which can be found in Eastern and Southeastern Europe. They are recorded at least since the 11th century in Croatia in the form of a personal name Hrvatin. Since the 14th century they can be found in area of the Croatian capital city of Zagreb, in Bosnia and Herzegovina and especially in the area of East Herzegovina, as well Dečani chrysobulls of Serbia, while since the 15th century in Montenegro, Kosovo, and North Macedonia. The surnames in Poland - Karwat, Carwad, Charwat, Carwath, Horwat, Horwath, Horwatowie - are recorded since the 14th century in Kraków, Przemyśl and else, generally among Polish native nobility, peasants, and local residents, but not among the foreigners. They used it as a nickname, but probably due to the influence of immigration from the Kingdom of Hungary. Since the 16th century surname Harvat is recorded in Romania.

It is mentioned in the form of surnames Horvat, Horvatin, Hrvatin, Hrvatinić, Hrvatić, Hrvatović, Hrvet, Hervatić, H(e)rvatinčić, H(e)rvojević, Horvatinić, Horvačević, Horvatinović, Hrvović, Hrvoj, Rvat, and Rvatović. Today the surname Horvat is most numerous surname in Croatia, second most numerous in Slovenia (where's also in the form Hrovat, Hrovatin, Hrvatin), while Horváth is the most numerous surname in Slovakia and one of the most numerous in Hungary. In Czech Republic there's surname Charvat.

In the form of male personal names exist Hrvoje, Hrvoj, Hrvoja, Horvoja, Hrvojhna, Hrvatin, Hrvajin, Hrvo, Hrvojin, Hrvojica, Hrvonja, Hrvat, Hrvad, Hrvadin, Hrviša, Hrvoslav, Rvoje, as well as female Hrvatica, Hrvojka, Hrvatina, and Hrvoja. Today personal name Hrvoje is one of the most common in Croatia.

Official name of Croatia
Throughout its history, there were many official political names of Croatia in the 20th century. When Croatia was part of the Kingdom of Yugoslavia, the entity was known as Banovina Hrvatska (Banovina of Croatia). After Yugoslavia was invaded in 1941, it became known as Nezavisna Država Hrvatska (Independent State of Croatia) as a puppet state of Nazi Germany and Fascist Italy. The present Croatian state became known as Federalna Država Hrvatska (Federal State of Croatia) when the country became part of the second Yugoslav state in 1944 following the third session of ZAVNOH. From 1945, the state became Narodna Republika Hrvatska (People's Republic of Croatia) and renamed again to Socijalistička Republika Hrvatska (Socialist Republic of Croatia) in 1963. After the constitution was adopted in December 1990, it was renamed to Republika Hrvatska (Republic of Croatia) and the name was retained when Croatia declared independence on June 25, 1991.

See also
White Croats
White Croatia
Origin hypotheses of the Croats

References

Notes

Sources

Further reading

 

Croatia, names for
History of Croatia
Ethnonyms